Arkholme for Kirkby Lonsdale railway station served the village of Arkholme in Lancashire, England. It is situated on what is now the Leeds–Morecambe line between the current Wennington and Carnforth stations.

History

Opened by the Furness and Midland Joint Railway in 1867, then run by the Midland Railway, it became part of the London, Midland and Scottish Railway during the Grouping of 1923. The station then passed on to the London Midland Region of British Railways on nationalisation in 1948. It was then closed by the British Transport Commission on 12 September 1960 when the local stopping service between Wennington & Carnforth was withdrawn.

The site today

Trains on the Leeds to Morecambe line still pass the site.  The station building was converted to a private dwelling after closure and is still used as such today.  It was once owned by comedian and television personality Jim Bowen and featured on the TV programme Through the Keyhole.

Notes

Sources 
 
 
 
 Station on navigable O.S. map

External links
Photo of the Station
Railscot – Arkholme

Disused railway stations in Lancaster
Railway stations in Great Britain opened in 1867
Railway stations in Great Britain closed in 1960
Former Midland Railway stations
Former Furness Railway stations